The Best of Type O Negative is an album from Roadrunner Records, featuring a collection of Type O Negative's music with the label. The album was released without Type O Negative's involvement (they were signed to SPV Records by the time of this compilation's release).

Songs from the albums The Origin of the Feces and then-new material from Least Worst Of are not represented on the album. Despite being an unsanctioned release, the cover of Deep Purple's "Highway Star" does not appear on any other Type O Negative release and is exclusive to the compilation - with the exception of its previous inclusion on the compilation NASCAR: Crank It Up.

The album was released on September 12, 2006, simultaneously with similarly unsanctioned best-of collections of the bands Sepultura, Fear Factory, and Ill Niño.

Track listing
All songs written by Peter Steele except where noted.
 "Unsuccessfully Coping with the Natural Beauty of Infidelity" – 12:37
Originally from Slow, Deep and Hard (1991)
 "Christian Woman" – 4:29
Edited version
Originally from Bloody Kisses (1993)
 "Black No.1 (Little Miss Scare-All)" – 4:40
Edited version
Originally from Bloody Kisses (1993)
 "Too Late: Frozen" – 7:53
Originally from Bloody Kisses (1993)
 "Love You to Death" – 4:51
Edited version
Originally from October Rust (1996)
 "My Girlfriend's Girlfriend" – 3:49
Originally from October Rust (1996)
 "Cinnamon Girl" (Neil Young) – 4:08
Neil Young cover
Originally from October Rust (1996)
 "Everyone I Love Is Dead" – 4:41
Edited version
Originally from World Coming Down (1999)
 "Everything Dies" – 4:37
Edited version
Originally from World Coming Down (1999)
 "Highway Star" (Ian Gillan, Ritchie Blackmore, Roger Glover, Jon Lord, Ian Paice) – 5:57
Deep Purple cover
Originally from NASCAR: Crank It Up (2002)
 "I Don't Wanna Be Me" – 3:49
Edited version
Originally from Life Is Killing Me (2003)
 "Life Is Killing Me" – 6:47
Originally from Life Is Killing Me (2003)

Personnel
Peter Steele - lead vocals, bass guitar, additional electric guitar & keyboards
Kenny Hickey - backing vocals, co-lead vocals (on "Black No.1 (Little Miss Scare-All)" and "Highway Star"), acoustic guitar, electric guitar
Josh Silver - backing vocals, keyboards, sound effects
Sal Abruscato - drums, percussion (on tracks 1-4)
Johnny Kelly - backing vocals, drums, percussion (on tracks 5-12)

References

Type O Negative albums
2006 greatest hits albums
Roadrunner Records compilation albums